Velma Caldwell Melville (Caldwell; July 1, 1858 – August 25, 1924) was an American editor, and writer of prose and poetry from Wisconsin. She served as editor of the "Home Circle and Youths' Department" of the Practical Farmer of Philadelphia, Pennsylvania as well as for the "Hearth and Home Department" of the Wisconsin Farmer, of Madison, Wisconsin. She was one of the most voluminous writers of her time in Central/Western United States publications. Melville wrote several serials, and her poems and sketches appeared in nearly 100 publications.

Early life and education
Velma Caldwell was born in Greenwood, Vernon County, Wisconsin, July 1, 1858. Her parents were William A. Caldwell and the former Artlissa Jordan. They were originally from Ohio, moving to Wisconsin in 1855. The father died during the Siege of Petersburg when Melville was five years old, which subsequently influenced her intensely patriotic writings.

Career
Melville's productions in verse and prose appeared extensively in the St. Louis Observer, St. Louis Magazine, Housekeeper, Ladies' Home Journal, Daughters of America, Chicago Inter Ocean, Advocate and Guardian, Weekly Wisconsin, Midland School Journal, Chicago Ledger, West Shore Magazine and many other publications. She served as editor of the "Home Circle and Youth's Department" of the Practical Farmer of Philadelphia, and the "Health and Home Department" in the Wisconsin Farmer of Madison. Melville was a devoted follower of Henry Bergh. She was said to "speak for those who can not speak for themselves", being one of the most voluminous writers in publications of that time that the Central/Western US had produced.

Melville was the author of White Dandy, Or Master And I; A Horse's Story.  A companion to Black Beauty, it tells a similar story of the adventures and abuses of a horse, —of several horses— from the animal's standpoint. It was well written and was said to help forward the movement for the protection and proper care of animals, teaching kindness to the horse as well as to other animals. It was issued by J.S. Ogilvie Publishing Company, New York, and was sold for US$0.25 per copy.

Personal life
At the age of 20, she married James Melville, C. E., a graduate of the Wisconsin State University, who went on to become an educator and a prohibitionist. For 10 years, her home was in Poynette, Wisconsin, before she removed to Sun Prairie, Wisconsin, where her husband was principal of the high school.

She died on August 25, 1924, in Gainesville, Florida.

Selected works 
 Queen Bess
 White Dandy; or, Master and I: A Horse's Story (1898)

References

Attribution

External links
 
 
 

1858 births
1924 deaths
People from Vernon County, Wisconsin
19th-century American poets
19th-century American newspaper editors
19th-century American women writers
American women poets
Women newspaper editors
Writers from Wisconsin
People from Poynette, Wisconsin
People from Sun Prairie, Wisconsin
American women non-fiction writers
Wikipedia articles incorporating text from A Woman of the Century